The Minister for Tourism, Culture, Arts, Gaeltacht, Sport and Media is a senior minister in the Government of Ireland and leads the Department of Tourism, Culture, Arts, Gaeltacht, Sport and Media.

The current minister is Catherine Martin, TD.

She is assisted by two Ministers of State:
Patrick O'Donovan, TD – Minister of State for Gaeltacht
Thomas Byrne, TD – Minister of State for Sport and Physical Education

Overview
The Minister for Economic Planning and Development was created by the Ministers and Secretaries (Amendment) Act 1977. The title and functions of the position have changed several times since then. The current title was adopted in 2020 by the 32nd Government.

Culture
Creating an environment enabling the National Cultural Institutions to flourish through the provision of financial resources and an appropriate policy framework. The National Cultural Institutions include: the National Archives of Ireland, National Concert Hall, National Library of Ireland, National Museum of Ireland, Chester Beatty Library, Irish Museum of Modern Art and National Gallery of Ireland. Formulation, development and evaluation of policy and structures to promote and foster the practice and appreciation of the creative and interpretative arts and to encourage the development of the Irish film industry; enabling the national cultural institutions, as integral elements of the national culture, to preserve, protect and present for the benefit of present and future generations our moveable heritage and cultural assets.

List of office-holders

Notes

References

External links
Department of Tourism, Culture, Arts, Gaeltacht, Sport and Media

Government ministers of the Republic of Ireland
Killarney
Lists of government ministers of Ireland
Ministries established in 1977
Ireland
Minister